Allan Trevor (1923 - 1969) was an Australian actor, writer and producer.

He worked on the land for near six years but decided to give it away when he realised he would not earn enough money to buy his own farm. He did various jobs, including police cadet, shop assistant and salesman, before he began to study acting in Perth in 1941. He moved to Sydney in 1947 and ended up becoming one of the leading radio actors in the city, appearing in more than 500 radio plays and serials. He won the Macquarie Acting Award for Best Actor.

He moved into writing and producing. He died suddenly in Melbourne in 1969.

Select credits
The Adventures of Long John Silver (1955) - actor
Three in One (1957) - actor
Armchair Theatre (1960) - actor
The Patriots (1962) - actor
Tribunal (1963) - actor
The Angry General (1965) - writer
The Man Who Saw It (1966) - writer
Topaze (1966) - actor
Homicide (1966–67) - actor
Contrabandits (1967) - writer
Slow Poison (1967) - writer
Hunter (1967–69) - producer, actor
Division 4 (1969–70) -producer, actor

References

External links

1923 births
1969 deaths
Australian male actors
Australian television producers
Australian screenwriters
Writers from Perth, Western Australia
20th-century Australian screenwriters
Male actors from Perth, Western Australia